The Battle of Măcin, Battle of Maçin, Battle of Matchin or Battle of Matschin was a battle of the Russo-Turkish War (1787–1792) fought on 9 July 1791 between the Ottoman Empire and the Russian Empire. The Russian army of 30,000 was commanded by Prince Nicholas Repnin, whereas the Turks, numbering about 80,000 men, were led by Koca Yusuf Pasha.

Battle
At first, the victory was in doubt, but then the Turkish army was vanquished by a charge of the Russian left, under Mikhail Illarionovich Kutuzov, and started retreating in disorder.

Notes

References
 

Battles involving the Ottoman Empire
Battles involving Russia
Battle of Macin
1791 in Europe
1791 in the Ottoman Empire